Saia or SAIA may refer to:

Organisations
Saia (Nasdaq: SAIA), an American trucking company
South African Institute of Architects
South Australian Institute of Architects, a predecessor organisation of the Australian Institute of Architects
Space Accident Investigation Authority of the United Kingdom

Places
Saia, Estonia, a village in Saaremaa Parish
Saia Maior, a civitas of the Roman Empire, possibly located in modern-day Tunisia

People with the given name
Saia Makisi (born 1981), Tongan rugby league footballer
Saia Fainga'a (born 1987), Australian rugby union footballer
Saia Piukala, Tongan politician

People with the surname
Jorge Zontal (born Slobodan Saia-Levy; 1944–1994), Canadian artist
Jim Saia (born 1964), American basketball coach

See also

Saya (disambiguation)